Nathalie Michelle Sinclair (born 1970) is a Canadian researcher in mathematics education who holds the Canada Research Chair in Tangible Mathematics Learning at Simon Fraser University in Vancouver.

Early life and education
Sinclair was born in Grenoble, the daughter of Canadian academics who were on sabbatical there; she grew up in Calgary. She began her undergraduate studies at McGill University in business, but quickly switched to mathematics, and then earned a master's degree with Len Berggren at Simon Fraser on the history of mathematics and mathematics in medieval Islam.

She became a middle school teacher of mathematics and French on Bowen Island, Sinclair then earned her Ph.D. in 2002 from Queen's University at Kingston, under the joint supervision of Peter Taylor of the Department of Mathematics and Statistics and William Higginson of the Faculty of Education.

Career

In 2003, Sinclair accepted a joint appointment in the College of Natural Sciences and the College of Education at Michigan State University.

In 2014, Sinclair and Nicholas Jackiw developed a mathematical app targeted at children ages three to eight. The purpose of the app is to teach children math through "hands-on" learning. Two years later, she was named a Tier 2 Canada Research Chair in Tangible Mathematics Learning.

In March 2017, Sinclair was named Canada's Mathematics Ambassador by Partners in Research for her contributions to the field of mathematics. Later that year, Sinclair was elected a Member of the College of New Scholars, Artists and Scientists of the Royal Society of Canada. In 2019, Sinclair was awarded the Svend Pedersen Lecture Award.

Selected publications
. Winner of the Janet Duffin Award for the best paper of the year in Research in Mathematics Education.
. Honourable Mention for Innovations in Curriculum Studies, American Educational Research Association, 2015.

References

External links
Home page
Google scholar profile

1970 births
Living people
Mathematics educators
McGill University Faculty of Science alumni
Simon Fraser University alumni
Queen's University at Kingston alumni
Academic staff of Simon Fraser University
Canada Research Chairs
Canadian women mathematicians
21st-century Canadian mathematicians
21st-century women mathematicians